The qualification phase for the 2014 African Nations Championship was played from November 2012 to August 2013. Qualification was divided into the CAF Regional Zones. Each zone had either two or three teams that qualified for the final tournament in South Africa.

Qualification Zones

North Zone

First Round 
The 2 winners of the First Round qualify for the final tournament. Algeria withdrew due to poor squad standards.

|}

Zone West A

Preliminary Round 
The 2 Preliminary Round winners qualify for the First Round.
Mali and Senegal receive a bye and advance directly to the First Round.

|}

First Round 
The 2 winners of the First Round qualify for the final tournament.

|}

Zone West B

Preliminary Round 
The Preliminary Round winner qualify for the First Round.
Ghana, Niger, Côte d'Ivoire, Nigeria and Benin receive a bye and advance directly to the First Round.

|}

First Round 
The 3 winners of the First Round qualify for the final tournament. Benin withdrew from the tournament for financial reasons.

|}

Nigeria withdrew due to financial constraints on 11 April 2013, but one month later they confirmed their participation.

Central Zone

Preliminary Round 
The Preliminary Round winner qualify for the First Round.
DR Congo, Cameroon and Gabon receive a bye and advance directly to the First Round.

|}

 Central African Republic withdrew. Game was awarded 3–0 to Congo.

First Round 
The 2 winners of the First Round qualify for the final tournament.
The 2 losers of the First Round qualify for the Second Round.

|}

Second Round 
The winner of the Second Round qualify for the final tournament.

|}

Central-East Zone

Preliminary Round 
The 2 Preliminary Round winners qualify for the First Round.
Sudan, Uganda, Rwanda and Tanzania receive a bye and advance directly to the First Round.

|}

 Eritrea withdrew on December 5, 2012. Game was awarded 3–0 to Ethiopia.

First Round 
The 3 winners of the First Round qualify for the final tournament.

|}

Southern Zone

Preliminary Round 
The 2 Preliminary Round winners qualify for the First Round.
Angola, Botswana, Namibia, Swaziland, Zambia and Zimbabwe receive a bye and advance directly to the First Round.
Note: Mozambique was not included in the initial draw published by CAF on June 9, 2012, and Seychelles was supposed to also receive a bye and advance directly to the First Round, but then Mozambique was included to play a Preliminary Round against Seychelles, the qualifier taking the spot in the First Round which was firstly drawn for Seychelles (vs. Namibia).

|}

First Round 
The 4 winners of the First Round qualify for the Second Round.

|}

Second Round 
The 2 winners of the Second Round qualify for the final tournament, along with hosts South Africa.

|}

Qualified teams

References 

African Nations Championship qualification
Qualification
Qualif